East Meixi Lake station is a subway station in Yuelu District, Changsha, Hunan, China, operated by the Changsha subway
Changsha Metro. It entered revenue service on December 28, 2015.

History
The station opened on 28 December 2015.

Layout

Surrounding area
 Entrance No. 1: Babazui Community, Meixi Lake
 Entrance No. 2: Luyanghejing Village
 Entrance No. 2: Hunan Aerospace Information CO. , Ltd., Yuelu School
 Entrance No. 4: International Culture and Arts Center of Meixi Lake, Meixi Lake

References

Railway stations in Hunan
Railway stations in China opened in 2015